is a Japanese mecha  original video animation produced by Brain's Base and Studio A-Cat, and directed by Keiji Gotoh.

Cast

References

External links
 Brain's Base official site 
 

Brain's Base
Mecha anime and manga
Studio A-Cat